The Civil Union Act, 2006 (Act No. 17 of 2006) is an act of the Parliament of South Africa which legalised same-sex marriage. It allows two people, regardless of gender, to form either a marriage or a civil partnership. The act was enacted as a consequence of the judgment of the Constitutional Court in the case of Minister of Home Affairs v Fourie, which ruled that it was unconstitutional for the state to provide the benefits of marriage to opposite-sex couples while denying them to same-sex couples.

Legislative history
The Constitutional Court's judgment set a deadline of 1 December 2006 for Parliament to rectify the situation. If Parliament missed the deadline, words would be "read in" to the Marriage Act to allow same-sex marriages to take place.

On 24 August 2006, the Cabinet approved the Civil Union Bill for submission to Parliament. It was introduced in the National Assembly by the Minister of Home Affairs on 12 September. The original bill only allowed for civil partnerships between same-sex partners, and also included provisions to recognise domestic partnerships between unmarried partners, both same-sex and opposite-sex. The bill was amended by the Portfolio Committee on Home Affairs to allow both marriages and civil partnerships, and to open them to opposite-sex as well as same-sex couples. The committee also removed the provisions dealing with unregistered domestic partnerships.

The final vote in the National Assembly was held on 14 November. The ruling African National Congress called a three line whip, requiring its MPs to vote for the bill. Most opposition parties voted against it, while the Democratic Alliance allowed its MPs a conscience vote. The bill passed by 229 votes to 41 with two abstentions. The National Council of Provinces passed it on 28 November by 36 votes to 11 with one abstention. It was signed on 29 November by Deputy President Phumzile Mlambo-Ngcuka (acting for President Thabo Mbeki) and came into force the following day.

Provisions
A civil union may be contracted under the act by a same-sex or opposite-sex couple, and they may choose to form it either as a marriage or as a civil partnership. Whichever name is chosen, the legal consequences of a civil union are the same as those of a marriage under the Marriage Act. Any reference to marriage in any law is deemed to include a civil union, and any reference to a husband, wife or spouse is deemed to include a spouse or partner in a civil union.

A person may not contract a marriage or civil partnership if he or she is already married (or civilly partnered) under the Civil Union Act, the Marriage Act, or the Recognition of Customary Marriages Act. Both partners must be 18 or older and mentally competent. The same prohibited degrees of consanguinuity and affinity apply as would apply under the Marriage Act.

A marriage or civil partnership must be solemnized by a marriage officer in the presence of the partners and two witnesses. The solemnization may occur in a public office, a private house, or in premises used for the purpose by the marriage officer. The marriage officer asks each partner:

and when each partner has said "yes", the marriage officer solemnizes the marriage by saying:

Secular marriage officers under the Marriage Actmagistrates and Home Affairs officialsare automatically marriage officers for the purposes of the Civil Union Act. Marriage officers who are ministers of religion are not marriage officers for the purposes of the Civil Union Act unless both they and their denomination apply to be designated as such. Unlike the Marriage Act, the Civil Union Act does not place any restriction on the religious denominations of legally designated marriage officers. Marriage officers have the same powers, responsibilities and duties under the Civil Union Act as they do under the Marriage Act.

Amendment
The Act originally allowed secular marriage officers to be exempted from performing same-sex marriages on the grounds of conscience, religion or belief. This provision was repealed in October 2020 by the Civil Union Amendment Act, 2020, with exemptions expiring after a two-year transition period. During the transition period every office of the Department of Home Affairs is required to have an official available to perform same-sex marriages.

References

External links

 Official text of the Act
 National Assembly debate on the Civil Union Bill
 National Council of Provinces debate on the Civil Union Bill

South African legislation
2006 in LGBT history
2006 in South African law
LGBT law in South Africa
Same-sex marriage in South Africa
South African family law
Same-sex union legislation
LGBT marriage law